Transformer read-only storage (TROS) was a type of read-only memory (ROM) used in the 1960s and early 1970s before solid-state memory devices were developed.

Overview
TROS was created by IBM as a read-only storage method for storing microcode for IBM computers. TROS used stacks of removable Mylar flexible printed wiring sheets that fitted onto fixed transformer bases. It was used on the IBM System/360 Model 20, IBM System/360 Model 40 and the Type 2841 file control unit.

Use
TROS memory was used to store microcode for mainframe computers and intelligent controllers used to control sophisticated storage devices such as disk drives and tape drives. If there were a bug in the microcode it was possible to rework it by replacing one or more of the printed wiring sheets, thereby changing the contents of the microcode memory.

References

External links
 
 Full text of U.S. Patent 3432830
Newcastle University staff: Roger Broughton Museum article
Ken Shirrif article on TROS

Computer storage technologies